Heliophanus ramosus is a jumping spider species in the genus Heliophanus.  It was first described by Wanda Wesołowska in 1986 and lives in Algeria, Portugal and Spain.

References

Spiders described in 1986
Fauna of Algeria
Fauna of Portugal
Fauna of Spain
Spiders of Europe
Salticidae
Spiders of Africa
Taxa named by Wanda Wesołowska